Sione Tulimaiau Mafileo (born 14 April 1993) is a New Zealand rugby union footballer who currently plays as a prop for  in the ITM Cup and the  in the international Super Rugby competition.

Early career

Mafileo attended Wesley college and excelled in Rugby playing the role of a bust-out prop with excellent speed & acceleration. He later attended Saint Kentigern College in Auckland and won the Auckland schools competition with them in 2012.

Senior career

Despite being named in North Harbour's squad for the 2013 ITM Cup, serious illness prevented him from making any appearances that year. He managed to make it onto the field the following season, but was merely a bit part player, playing 3 times. 2015 was when he really started to establish himself as Harbour's first choice in the number 3 jersey, he played 9 times that season, all of his appearances coming from the start.

Super Rugby

The Blues, under new head-coach Tana Umaga retained his services for 2016 and he went on to play 6 times during the year, including his first 2 starts for the franchise. He was again named in the Blues squad for the 2017 season.

International

Mafileo was a New Zealand Schoolboys representative in 2011 and was a member of the New Zealand Under 20 which competed in the 2013 IRB Junior World Championship in France where he made 5 appearances.

Career Honours

North Harbour

Mitre 10 Cup Championship - 2016

Super Rugby Statistics

References

1993 births
Living people
New Zealand rugby union players
Rugby union props
North Harbour rugby union players
Blues (Super Rugby) players
People educated at Saint Kentigern College
Moana Pasifika players
Chiefs (rugby union) players